The 1985 National League was contested as the second division of Speedway in the United Kingdom.

Team changes
A new team called the Barrow Blackhawks entered the league but only staged a handful of fixtures. The team failed to meet the minimum points limit resulting in the league authorities stopping their participation. Scunthorpe Stags withdrew from the league in May.

Summary
The title was won by the Ellesmere Port Gunners. Barrow Blackhawks withdrew in May and had their results expunged.

Final table

National League Knockout Cup
The 1985 National League Knockout Cup was the 18th edition of the Knockout Cup for tier two teams. Eastbourne Eagles were the winners of the competition.

First round

Abandoned

Second round

Quarter-finals

Semi-finals

Final
First leg

Second leg

Eastbourne were declared Knockout Cup Champions, winning on aggregate 83–73.

Leading averages

Riders & final averages
Arena Essex

Neil Middleditch 9.47
Martin Goodwin 7.42
Bob Humphreys 6.96
David Cheshire 6.90
David Smart 6.29
Alan Sage 5.63
Gary Chessell 4.77
Ian Humphreys 2.44
Sean Barker 2.12

Barrow (withrew from the league)

Paul Price 4.40
Kevin Armitage 4.00
Gary O'Hare 3.76
Eric Broadbelt 3.37
Terry Kelly 1.87
Bob Coles 1.71
Gary Clegg 1.33
Wayne Jackson 1.00

Berwick

Jimmy McMillan 8.24
Steve McDermott 7.70 
Bruce Cribb 7.56
Charlie McKinna 7.56
Rob Grant Sr. 7.06
Sean Courtney 5.87
Phil Kynman 5.27
Jacko Irving 4.00

Birmingham

Doug Wyer 8.57
Reg Wilson 7.50
Phil White 7.39
Paul Evitts 6.03
Paul Stead 5.90
Linden Warner 4.50
Mark Stevenson 4.43
Ian M Stead 3.45
Julian Parr 2.80

Canterbury

Dave Mullett 8.78 
Mike Spink 7.97 
Rob Tilbury 6.44
Neville Tatum 5.72
Bill Barrett 5.64
Steve Bryenton 5.16
Lawrie Bloomfield 4.26
Mark Terry 2.13

Eastbourne

Gordon Kennett 10.47
Colin Richardson 8.66
Andy Buck 7.26
Martin Dugard 5.69
Keith Pritchard 5.63
Paul Clarke 5.49
Chris Mulvihill 4.38
Derek Harrison 3.18
Dean Standing 1.21

Edinburgh

Brett Saunders 7.46 
Bobby Beaton 7.39
Steve Finch 7.02 
Dave Trownson 6.13
Phil Jeffrey 5.70
Billy Burton 5.04
Mark Burrows 4.18
Alan Mason 3.76
Gordon Whitaker 3.24
Roger Lambert 2.97
Scott Lamb 1.92

Ellesmere Port

Joe Owen 10.47 
Louis Carr 9.37 
Dave Morton 8.03 
David Walsh 6.73 
Gary O'Hare 6.00 
Miles Evans 5.76
Phil Alderman 5.37
Richie Owen 4.78

Exeter

Colin Cook 7.74 
Rob Maxfield 7.74
Nigel Sparshott 7.39
Steve Bishop 7.14
Kevin Price 6.91
Michael Coles 6.28
Mike Semmonds 5.30
Dave Roberts 2.42

Glasgow

Steve Lawson 9.39 
Martin McKinna 6.60
Andy Reid 5.99
Kenny Brailsford 4.50
David Cassels 4.23
Jim Beaton 4.21
Brian Collins 4.05
Geoff Powell 4.00
Colin Caffrey 3.65

Hackney

Andy Galvin 8.02
Paul Whittaker 7.76 
Alan Mogridge 7.32
Barry Thomas 7.29
Richard Pettman 4.98

Long Eaton

Chris Pidcock 8.14
Dave Perks 8.09
David Tyler 7.06
Paul Stead 6.54
Graham Drury 5.97
Alan Molyneux 5.91
Gerald Short 5.85
Pete Smith 4.78
John Proctor 4.54
John Frankland 4.44
Mark Stevenson 4.00
Derek Cooper 2.70

Middlesbrough

Steve Wilcock 9.23 
Martin Dixon 8.93 
Mark Fiora 8.57
Gary Havelock 7.33 
Jim Burdfield 6.72
Geoff Pusey 6.04
Mark Crang 3.83
Ian Wedgwood 3.02
Roland Tebbs 1.54

Mildenhall

Carl Blackbird 9.64 
Melvyn Taylor 7.84 
Carl Baldwin 7.82
Robert Henry 7.46
Andy Hines 7.20
Rob Hollingworth 5.84 
Dave Jackson 5.45
Richard Green 3.92
Rob Parish 3.26
Wally Hill 2.54

Milton Keynes

Keith White 8.55 
Nigel De'ath 8.48 
David Blackburn 6.28
Derek Richardson 5.94
Kevin Smart 5.70
Mark Chessell .55
Ashley Pullen 4.00
Rob Wall 3.58
Peter McNamara 3.53
Rob Price 1.94

Peterborough

Kevin Hawkins 9.12
Mick Poole 7.52
Dave Allen 7.27
Ian Clark 6.73
Ian Barney 6.00
Keith Bloxsome 5.92
Adrian Hume 4.81
Pete Chapman 2.82

Poole

Stan Bear 9.79
Kevin Smith 9.32
Martin Yeates 8.40
David Biles 6.39
Marcus Bisson 6.09
Guy Wilson 5.98
Ray Dole 5.96
Dave Gibbs 3.95

Rye House

Andrew Silver 8.61
Alastair Stevens 7.37 
Rob Woffinden 6.84
Bobby Garrad 6.34 
Kelvin Mullarkey 5.91
Kevin Brice 4.41
Neil Cotton 4.33
Keith Millard 3.11
Gary Rolls 3.11
Nigel Leaver 2.10

Scunthorpe

Andy Buck 9.64
Rob Woffinden 7.54
Steve Finch 7.50
Derek Richardson 5.78
Julian Parr 4.57
Mark Burrows 4.40
Peter McNamara 1.93

Stoke

Nigel Crabtree 8.69 
Tom Owen 8.36
Paul Thorp 7.38
Graham Jones 5.70
Mike Wilding 5.53
Ian Stead 5.33
Darren Sumner 4.82
Nigel Harrhy 3.45

Wimbledon

Mike Ferreira 9.82
Roger Johns 9.64
Jamie Luckhurst 8.34
Kevin Teager 6.45
Peter Johns 5.09
Jeremy Luckhurst 4.94
Mark Baldwin 4.73

See also
List of United Kingdom Speedway League Champions
Knockout Cup (speedway)

References

Speedway British League Division Two / National League